Skuta Glacier (Slovenian: Ledenik pod Skuto), located beneath mountain Skuta in Kamnik-Savinja Alps in Slovenia is the most south-eastern glacier in the Alps.

Geography 
Skuta Glacier had an area of 2.8 hectares in 1950 and 1.6 in 2013.
Reaching 2020 metres above sea level at its lowest point, it is also one of the lowest elevation glaciers in the Alps.

Triglav glacieret is the second remaining glacier in Slovenia at the elevation of 2500 m.

Skuta Glacier in figures
 Area:  (as of 2007)
 Elevation: 
 Average ice thickness:  (as of September 2006)
 Maximum ice thickness:  (as of September 2006)
 Volume:  (as of September 2006)

References

Glaciers of Slovenia
Glaciers of the Alps
Landforms of Upper Carniola